This article discusses the history of transgender people, their rights, legislation concerning them, and transgender healthcare in Finland, from the earliest records in the 1800s to the present.

Before there was any legislation on transgender issues in Finland, it was possible for transgender people to change their gender marker or name, and transgender healthcare has been offered at least since the 1980s. There was however a lack of uniformity, as courts and local authorities had widely different practices; the national legislation which did apply was also generally not suited for serving transgender people. Drafting of a new Trans Act to cover these issues therefore began in the 1990s.

The first Finnish Trans Act was passed in 2002, coming into force the next year. This gave legal recognition to the existence of transgender people and uniformized the treatment of transgender people by public authorities. At the same time it posed a requirement that someone changing their gender be infertile, and may thus have made harder a process which had become relatively simple in the 1990s. The Council of Europe's Commissioner for Human Rights also opposed the mandatory sterilization and not being married being a prerequisite for a change of gender marker. The Social Democrat cabinets from 2019 onward promised to allow gender self-determination for adults. Meanwhile, in 2021 an initiative to reform the law, but with a lower age limit, was started by transgender advocacy organization . It garnered the necessary 50.000 signatures within two days, and was thus given to Parliament. The act was passed on 1 February 2023. As amended, it allows any adult to change their gender marker at their will.

Though trans patients were mentioned in medical journals in the 1800s and early 1900s, more extensive evidence exists from the 1950s onward. From the 50s to the 70s, psychiatrists were supportive of transgender patients' identities, but very reluctant to provide somatic treatments like hormone therapy or gender-affirming surgery. Through the 70s and 80s knowledge about trans healthcare had improved and treatments became available, and, by the 90s, relatively routine.

Before 2000
There are records of transgender people in Finland since the 1800s. In 1882, the Proceedings of the Finnish Medical Association published a case study of a patient who was assigned female at birth but identified as male. Another case of an  patient who identified as male was recorded in 1919. More records exist from the Helsinki Psychiatric Clinic from the 1950s and -60s. Psychiatrists generally tried to be supportive and would recommend gender-affirming social adjustments, but to many patients' frustrations did not prescribe hormone therapy or gender-affirming surgery, except in a very few cases. The first gender-affirming surgery in Finland was conducted in 1954, and another in the early 1960s. There were also an unknown number of failed operations, and some surgeries were performed in secret. In the following centuries, better information about transgender people became available, and treatments more common. By the end of the 1980s, approximately 35 people had been operated on in Finland, a number much smaller than those of other European countries.

Prior to any laws concerning transgender rights being passed, trans people could change their gender marker by going to their local register office, while transgender healthcare was regulated by the laws concerning castration, which were not intended for this purpose. Usually a psychiatrists diagnosis and evidence of infertility were required, but this was not always the case. The Name Act also permitted changing one's name. Only a small number of applications for castration for the purpose of gender-affirming care were made during the 1960s and -70s, which according to a report for the Ministry of Social Affairs and Health may suggest that this was not necessary to receive care. Applications became more numerous when, in the 1980s, it became a prerequisite for gender-affirming surgery, and eventually also started to be granted. In any case, the lack of legislation caused wide discrepancies in the treatment of transgender matters by public officials. In 1991, the Finnish Parliamentary Ombudsman declared there was an urgent need for a law concerning the change of one's gender marker. The Ministry of Health prepared a draft in 1992, which would have required people changing their legal gender to never have married or had children. The draft received heavy criticism, was deemed contrary to human rights, and never made it to parliament.

In the 1990s, the first national clinical guidelines for transgender health were issued in Finland, based on The Harry Benjamin International Gender Dysphoria Association's (now the World Professional Association for Transgender Health) Standards of Care for Gender Identity Disorders. The Helsinki-based Trans Support Centre also started offering support for trans people and training for professionals encountering them.

The Finnish trans rights organization Trasek was founded in 1984, and came to be recognized as a representative of trans patients in patients' rights.

The first Trans Act
The Trans Act was approved by Parliament on 28 June 2002, and became law the following year. The act provided that a person could change their legal gender, provided they fulfill four requirements: that they provide medical evidence of permanently identifying as belonging to the opposite gender, live as this gender, and are sterilized or otherwise infertile; that they be adult; that they not be married or in a civil union; and that they are a Finnish citizen or a permanent resident. This unified and standardized common procedures from the preceding years, but according to anthropologist , it actually made changing one's gender marker harder than it had become in the 1990s. The Act was further clarified by secondary legislation concerning among other issues which kind of medical evidence was necessary: a psychiatric evaluation and diagnosis. The infertility caused by hormone therapy was still seen as sufficient sterilization. However, the act and decree also made it harder to get hormone therapy, requiring a psychiatrist's recommendation for a treatment which previously could be prescribed by a doctor unconnected to the transgender health system. While hormonal sterilization was the most common, some patients did undergo surgical sterilizations in order to be allowed to change their gender marker.

Of the ICD-10's gender identity-related diagnoses only Transsexualism (F64.0) was an acceptable reason to change one's gender marker, and not for example Other gender identity disorders (F64.8).

Beginning with a 2010 campaign by Seta, reforming the Trans Act was increasingly demanded by it as well as Trasek and Amnesty. In 2011 the Finnish equality commissioner said the infertility requirement breached human rights and should be immediately removed. In 2012, after a visit to Finland, the Council of Europe's Commissioner for Human Rights, Nils Muižnieks demanded that the provisions about infertility and being unmarried be removed.

A workgroup of the Ministry of Social Affairs and Health sat from 2013 to 2014, aiming to investigate a possible reform of the legislation. Though its conclusion was criticized as lacking by Seta and Trasek, it proposed abolishing the Trans Act's controversial requirements, as well as suggesting that gender self-determination be looked into. It also delivered a draft amendment to the government, which never made it to Parliament.

Towards the 2023 Trans Act
Reforming the Trans Act such as to allow adults to self-determine their gender was part of the Rinne and Marin Cabinets' government programmes. This was however criticized as lacking because is did not afford self-determination to minors. On 5 April 2021, Trans ry, an offshoot of Trasek, started an initiative to reform the Trans Act. The initiative demanded self-determination for anyone ages 15 and up, and would have required parental consent for those under. The initiative had gathered the 50.000 signatures necessary to be discussed in Parliament by the day after. Panda Eriksson, former president of Trans ry, handed the initiative to Parliament on 17 September 2021.

The government's proposal was presented to Parliament on 22 September 2022, with the planned age limit of eighteen years. It was first debated by the Social Affairs and Health committee; while the bill was successfully sent to the plenary session, the Centre Party voted against it, prompting Prime Minister Sanna Marin to accuse them of violating the government's agreed-upon rules. After the National Coalition's demand, the bill was also amended to require at least one year between successive applications, unless an important reason is presented. The committee also put forward statements demanding the government investigate and eventually put forward bills on the matters of transgender people in sports and self-determination for trans youth.

The bill was passed by Parliament on 1 February 2023 with votes 113–69. Representatives voted along party lines, except for the government Centre Party and opposition National Coalition, whose votes were split. The statement concerning transgender youth also passed.

Notes

References

LGBT history in Europe
LGBT in Finland
Transgender history